St. Mark's Episcopal Church is a historic Episcopal church at 69-75 Hudson Avenue in Green Island, Albany County, New York.  It was built in 1866–1867 in a Gothic Revival style.  It is a rectangular, brick trimmed stone church building with a steeply pitched roof with three steeply pitched dormers, covered in polychrome slate.  The front gable features three pointed Gothic windows and a rose window.  It also has a stone bell tower.  The two story brick rectory was added in 1883–1884.

It was listed on the National Register of Historic Places in 1978.

References

External links

Episcopal church buildings in New York (state)
Churches on the National Register of Historic Places in New York (state)
Churches completed in 1866
19th-century Episcopal church buildings
Churches in Albany County, New York
19th-century Church of England church buildings
1866 establishments in New York (state)
National Register of Historic Places in Albany County, New York